Library.nu, previously called ebooksclub.org from 2004 to 2007 and gigapedia.com from 2007 to 2010, was a popular linking website. It was accused of copyright infringement and was shut down by court order on February 15, 2012. According to the takedown notice, it hosted some 400,000 ebooks.

Operators
According to an article posted in the British The Sunday Times, investigators believed that library.nu was operated by Irish nationals, possibly from Galway, through a server in Kyiv.

Injunction
This website was targeted by coordinated legal action from 17 publishers who obtained an injunction from a Munich court. The majority of the claimed infringing files were hosted on the iFile.it file hosting service, whose representatives however disclaimed a close relationship with Library.nu. In contrast, a representative of a private intellectual property agency hired by the book publishers stated that the "owners and directors of iFile.it" were the persons whose names appeared on the receipts of PayPal donations to Library.nu. According to TorrentFreak, "the legal team of the publishers estimated the revenue based on page impressions as well as estimated income from premium accounts, but this figure is laughable according to the iFile.it owner, which makes sense considering the site’s modest size." The iFile.it owner also told TorrentFreak that "they can barely cover the server costs with the revenue they make."

Aftermath
The URL "library.nu" was revoked by the .nu domain on 20 February 2012. Between the day of indictment and 24 February, library.nu redirected to Google Books.

See also 
 Anna's Archive
 Business aspects of academic publishing
 Open access
 Serials crisis
 Textbook market
 Megaupload
 Library Genesis

References

Further reading 
 Estienne, Pierre "The burning of library.nu", Knowledge Utopia (Blog)
 Ernesto, "Book Publishers ‘Shut Down’ Library.nu and iFile-it", TorrentFreak, February 15, 2012
 Losowsky, Andrew, "Library.nu, Book Downloading Site, Targeted In Injunctions Requested By 17 Publishers", Huffington Post, February 16, 2012
 Wujastyk, Dominik, "Burning the Library of Alexandria, again", Cikitsā blog, Tuesday, February 28, 2012
 Kelty, Christopher M., "The disappearing virtual library", Al Jazeera, March 1, 2012
 Liang, Lawrence. (2012). Shadow Libraries. e-flux.

Defunct websites
Internet properties disestablished in 2012
Internet services shut down by a legal challenge
Open content
Irish digital libraries